Mehmet Şemsettin Günaltay (17 July 1883 – 19 October 1961) was a Turkish historian, politician, and Prime Minister of Turkey from 1949 to 1950.

Biography
Günaltay was born 1883 in the Kemaliye town of the Vilayet of Mamuret-ul-Aziz, Ottoman Empire. He was a graduate of Vefa High School, Istanbul. After finishing the Teacher's College, he was educated in physics at the University of Lausanne in Switzerland.

After his return to Turkey, Günaltay worked as a teacher in a number of high schools. During this time, he got to know Ziya Gökalp, a prominent ideologue of Pan-Turkism. Influenced by him, he began to carry out research on Turkish history. In 1914, he was appointed professor of the history of Turks and Islamic tribes at the Faculty of Letters of Istanbul University. Later, he served as the dean of the Faculty of Theology at the same university.

Political career
In 1915, Günaltay was elected to the Ottoman Parliament as deputy of Bilecik Province from the Committee of Union and Progress (CUP), and remained a member of the parliament until its dissolution. In the meantime, he continued to lecture at the university.

During the Turkish War of Independence, Günaltay joined the "Association of Defense of the Rights of Anatolia and Rumelia". After the foundation of the Republic of Turkey in 1923, he entered Turkish Grand National Assembly as deputy of Sivas Province from the Republican People's Party, serving for 27 years until 1950. Between 1950 and 1954, he represented Erzincan Province in the parliament.

After Prime Minister Hasan Saka's resignation, Günaltay was appointed by President İsmet İnönü to form his cabinet on January 16, 1949 that lasted until Adnan Menderes's Democratic Party took over the government on May 22, 1950 following the general elections. He was the last prime minister of the single party era in the politics of Turkey. He was a scholar of Islam and reopened the faculty of Divinity at the Ankara University, after its Faculty of Divinity was closed in 1933.
   
Günaltay died on October 19, 1961 in Istanbul due to prostate cancer, shortly after he was elected to the Senate to represent Istanbul Province (but before he could take his seat). He was laid to rest next to his daughter's grave in Ankara in accordance with his will.
 
Günaltay was also the head of the Turkish Historical Society from 1941 until his death.

Bibliography
 Zulmetten Nura (From Darkness to Light)
 Hurafattan Hakikata (From Superstition to Reality)
 İslam Dini Tarihi (History of the Religion of Islam)
 Maziden Atiye (From the Past to the Future)
 Mufassal Türk Tarihi (Detailed Turkish History)
 Tarih, (History)

References

External links

 Biyografi.net - Biography of Şemsettin Günaltay

1883 births
1961 deaths
20th-century prime ministers of Turkey
20th-century Turkish historians
People from Kemaliye
Republican People's Party (Turkey) politicians
Prime Ministers of Turkey
Deputies of Sivas
Deputies of Erzurum
Turkish Islamists
Academic staff of Istanbul University
University of Lausanne alumni
Members of the 18th government of Turkey
Deaths from cancer in Turkey
Deaths from prostate cancer
Vefa High School alumni